Stare Bielice  is a village in the administrative district of Gmina Drezdenko, within Strzelce-Drezdenko County, Lubusz Voivodeship, in western Poland.

Notable residents
Günther Maleuda (1931–2012), German politician

References

Stare Bielice